Dolphu  is a village development committee in Mugu District in the Karnali Zone of north-western Nepal. It is the largest VDC in the district located in the east and borders Tibet, China. At the time of the 1991 Nepal census it had a population of 573 people living in 125 individual households.

References

External links
UN map of the municipalities of Mugu District

Populated places in Mugu District